Bert Brooks (March 20, 1920September 2, 1968) was a Canadian racecar driver who was born in Fredericton, New Brunswick.

He made two attempts in 1961 for USAC Championship Car races, including the 1961 Indianapolis 500, failing to qualify because of his slow times.

Brooks was a sprint car racer on the east coast of the U.S., racing and capturing wins in Pennsylvania and New York.

References

External links
Bert Brooks at ChampCarStats

1920 births
1968 deaths
Racing drivers from New Brunswick